For the characters of  epic Ramayana, see Lava and Kusha.

Luv Kush (originally called Uttar Ramayan) is an Indian television series that ran from 1988 to 1989. It was created, written, produced, and directed by Ramanand Sagar. It is a follow-up  Ramayan, featuring mostly the same cast and production crew. Luv Kush covers the last book — the Uttara Kanda — of the ancient Indian epic Ramayana, following Rama's coronation, especially focusing on his children, twins Kush and Lav.

Amid the Coronavirus lockdown, all 39 episodes of this show were re-telecasted on DD National channel following Ramayan from 19 April 2020 to 2 May 2020.

Plot
Luv kush is a follow-up series of Ramayan and is based on the Uttara Kanda, which is the last chapter of Ramayana. It depicts the lives of Luv and Kush, the twin sons of Rama and Sita.

After Ram's coronation, he gets to know about Sita's pregnancy and the citizens of Ayodhya gossiping her character as she was forced to Live in Lanka. He trusts his wife and decides to leave that matter but Sita gets to know about this and tells Ram to abandon her is his duty as a king and she decides to leave to the forests. His brother Lakshman protests this but in vain and leaves her in the forest where she meets Rishi Valmiki who was composing Ramayana, the life incident of Rama. Rishi Valmiki accepts her as his daughter. She is provided shelter in his ashram. On the other hand, Ram is missing Sita and King Janaka (Sita's father) visits him and he gets to know that Sita's mother Sunayana has fallen ill after getting the news of her daughter's abandonment. Ram visits Mithila and apologize to her.

After coming back to Ayodhya, many sages complain about the tyrant King of Madhupur, Lavanasur and Ram sends his brother Shatrughna to kill him. On his way to Madhupur, he meets Sage Valmiki in ashram where Sita was living under incognito. He unknowingly performs the naming ceremony of his nephews Luv and Kush. He succeeded in slaying Lavanasur and is crowned as King of Madhupur.

As the years pass by, Luv and Kush are trained under Rishi Valmiki and are taught Ramayan by them. Kush always had a question in mind about why Ram abandoned Sita, not knowing that Sita is none other than his own mother as they knew her by the name Vandevi. 12 years later, Ram conducts an Ashvamedh Yagna and the horse is stopped by them as they wanted to know the answer to their questions. They fight with Lakshman, Bharat and Shatrughan and finally are about to fight with their father when Valmiki interrupts and ends the fight. In the evening they visit Sita and tells them about the days incident and Sita tells them that Ram is their father. They travel to Ayodhya singing the verses of Ramayan and make the citizens realise their mistake of doubting Devi Sita. Rama is eager to listen to the epic Ramayana. He invites Luv and Kush to his palace and listens to them along with his family and other courtiers. It is when he realises that both of them are his sons whereas citizens of Ayodhya still asks to prove Sita's character. Sita is called and Ram asks her to give the proof. Sita decides to give the last proof and calls her birth mother Bhumi Devi (Earth Goddess) and went away with her saying that this place is not safe for women and they are not respected here; leaving Luv and Kush with their father.

Years later, Lord Rama crowns his sons and nephews in different parts of Kosala and takes Jal Samadhi along with his brothers.

Cast
 Arun Govil as Rama, 7th Incarnation of Lord Vishnu; King of Ayodhya
 Deepika Chikhalia as Sita, Reincarnation of Goddess Lakshmi; Ram's wife
 Swapnil Joshi as Kusha,  Ram and Sita's elder son 
 Mayuresh Kshetramade as Luv, Ram and Sita's younger son
 Sunil Lahri as Lakshman, Ram's third younger brother; Reincarnation of Sheshanag
 Sanjay Jog as Bharat, Ram's second brother; Reincarnation of Lord Vishnu's Shankha
Sameer Rajda as Shatrughna; Reincarnation of Lord Vishnu's Sudarshan Chakra; Ram's youngest brother
Jayshree Gadkar as Kausalya; Ram's mother; King Dasrath's chief consort
Padma Khanna as Kaikeyi; Bharat's mother; King Dasrath's second queen
Rajni Bala as Sumitra; Lakshman and Shatrughan's mother
Anjali Vyas as Urmila; Lakshman's wife, Sita's younger sister
Sulakshana Khatri as Mandavi; Bharat's wife; Sita's cousin
Poonam Shetty as Shrutakirti; Shatrughan's wife; Mandavi's younger sister
Dara Singh as Hanuman; Lord Ram's devotee
Mukesh Rawal as Vibhishan; Ravan's brother who supported Lord Ram
Shyam Sunder Kalani as Sugriva; King of Kishkindha
Sudhir Dalvi as Vasishtha; teacher of Lord Rama
Chandrashekhar as Sumanta; King Dasrath's minister
Rajshekhar Upadhyay as Jamvanta
Vijay Kavish as Valmiki / Shiva; Devi Parvati's consort
 Vilas Raj as Lavanasura; Former King of Madhupura, nephew of Ravan; slayed by Shatrughan
Mulraj Rajda as Janak; Sita and Urmila's father; Mandavi and Shrutakirti's uncle
Urmila Bhatt as Sunaina; Sita and Urmila's mother; Mandavi and Shrutakirti's aunt
Aslam Khan as various characters
Bhushan Lakandari as Vishnu; The protector of Universe who reincarnated as Lord Ram

Production
Originally, Ramanand Sagar's plan was to end Ramayan with the return of Sita from exile. However on the demand from Valmiki Samaj and PMO, Sagar made the series as Ramayan's follow up.

Reception
During the premiere of the series during the Covid-19 lockdown following Ramayan on 19 April 2020, the viewership increased to a greater extent compared to Ramayan and received 18.493 million impressions during the morning slot and 48.553 million impressions during the night slot however being the most-watched Indian television program.

References

External links

Luv Kush Official Site on Sagar Films Limited

DD National original programming
1980s Indian television series
1988 Indian television series debuts
Sequel television series
Television series based on the Ramayana
Indian television spin-offs